The General Labour Union (Italian: Unione Generale del Lavoro) is an Italian Trade Union Confederation established in 1950, with the original denomination Confederazione Italiana Sindacati Nazionali Lavoratori (CISNAL). In 1996, CISNAL assumed its current name of General Labour Union (Italian: Unione Generale del Lavoro), a symbolic change to respond to the new challenges of third-millennium society and the reforms of work legislation, without forgetting the founders’ values.

The UGL, which has about 2 million members, has a close collaboration with the Lega di Matteo Salvini. Currently, the Deputy Minister of Labor of the Lega - 5 Stelle government is Claudio Durigon, former Deputy Secretary-General of UGL. At the enterprise level, UGL develops the Trade Union action to defend employees’ rights. In the framework of Italian industrial relations, it concurs to the realization of collective labor agreements.

UGL representatives seek to influence social legislation and policies, in the consultation process with the Public Authorities and the other Social Partners. UGL has its delegates as members of Italian and European institutions that gather civil society as CNEL and EESC. On September 15, 2020, UGL and Assodelivery, the Italian association which groups the workers of Deliveroo, Glovo, Uber Eats, Just Eat e Social Food, have signed the first European collective agreement for the so-called riders belonging to the food/beverage economic sector.

Values and aims
UGL, considering fundamental the centrality and the dignity of the human being, identifies in the Trade Union action a pillar for the improvement of social justice. UGL aims to sustainable economic development in modern society, in a vision that considers the ultimate objective of the overall national interest. UGL has a vision known at the international level as the so-called “conservative socialism” or “third position” (in Italian known as “social right-wing”), which aims to a synthesis between right-wing cultural views and left-wing economic views. To achieve this aim UGL proposes: • To overcome the ideological concept of social class and the consequent class conflict • To promote employees participation in the companies • To fight all the discriminations in the workplaces • To support the unity in the world of work

UGL considers that the achievement of an efficient social dialogue at Italian, European and World-wide levels, could represent a great resource to guarantee the workers’ rights, besides being an indispensable instrument able to contrast the worst consequences of globalization.

Structures
UGL is articulated in two different kinds of structures:

− Territorial Structures at a regional and provincial level, with 20 Regional Offices (URL), correspondent to the twenty Italian Regions, and Provincial Offices (UTL) for every Italian province

− Professional Federations for each working sector. Moreover it provides the following services: social assistance, fiscal assistance, professional training, agrarian training, housing assistance, promotion of culture and tourism, international cooperation.

The communication activities of UGL are realized by the publication of texts and documents, the Confederation’s newspaper The Social Goal (Italian:“La Meta Sociale”) with a daily edition.

Related items 
 Confederazione Italiana dei Lavoratori
 Movimento operaio
 CGIL
 UIL
 UGL
 
 CUB
 USB
 Unione Sindacale Italiana
 UILCEM
 Unione italiana lavoratori del tessile, energia e chimica

References

External links
 Official site in Italian

International Trade Union Confederation
National trade union centers of Italy
Trade unions established in 1950
1950 establishments in Italy
Fascist trade unions